Tigestol (INN, USAN), also known as 17α-ethynylestr-5(10)-en-17β-ol, is a steroidal progestin of the 19-nortestosterone group that was developed by Organon in the 1960s but was never marketed. It is an isomer of the related 19-nortestosterone derivative progestins lynestrenol and cingestol.

References

Estranes
Progestogens
Ethynyl compounds